The 1929 BYU Cougars football team was an American football team that represented Brigham Young University (BYU) as a member of the Rocky Mountain Conference (RMC) during the 1929 college football season. In their second season under head coach G. Ott Romney, the Cougars compiled an overall record of 5–3 with a mark of 4–2 against conference opponents, tied for fourth place in the RMC, and outscored opponents by a total of 140 to 115.

Schedule

References

BYU
BYU Cougars football seasons
BYU Cougars football